Rachid Aït-Atmane (born 4 January 1993), known simply as Rachid in Spain, is an Algerian professional footballer who plays as a central midfielder for JS Kabylie.

Club career
Born in Bobigny, Aït-Atmane finished his formation with RC Lens' youth setup, and made his senior debuts with the reserves in the 2010–11 campaign, in the Championnat de France amateur. On 4 June 2013 he moved abroad for the first time in his career, signing a two-year deal with Spanish side Sporting de Gijón and being assigned to the B-team of the Segunda División B.

Aït-Atmane played his first match as a professional on 23 August 2014, coming on as a second-half substitute in a 2–1 away success against CD Numancia in the Segunda División. On 10 July of the following year he renewed his contract until 2019, being definitely promoted to the main squad.

Aït-Atmane made his La Liga debut on 23 August 2015, coming on as a late substitute for Carlos Carmona in a 0–0 home draw against Real Madrid. On 31 January 2017, he was loaned to CD Tenerife until the end of the 2016–17 season.

On 19 January 2018, Aït-Atmane was loaned to Belgian side Waasland-Beveren. Upon returning, he terminated his contract on 31 August.

In November 2018, he signed a contract with Romanian club Dinamo București. He left the club in June 2019.

In 2023, he joined JS Kabylie.

International career
In November 2015, Aït-Atmane was called up to the Algerian under-23 national team for the first time for a friendly against Tunisia in preparation for the 2015 CAF U-23 Championship.

References

External links
Sporting official profile 

1993 births
Living people
People from Bobigny
French sportspeople of Algerian descent
Algerian footballers
French footballers
Association football midfielders
RC Lens players
S.K. Beveren players
FC Dinamo București players
Rachid
Rachid
CS Sfaxien players
Fujairah FC players
Rachid
Rachid
Rachid
Belgian Pro League players
Liga I players
Rachid
UAE Pro League players
Algerian expatriate footballers
French expatriate footballers
French expatriate sportspeople in Spain
Algerian expatriate sportspeople in Spain
Expatriate footballers in Spain
Expatriate footballers in Belgium
French expatriate sportspeople in Romania
Expatriate footballers in Romania
Algerian expatriate sportspeople in Tunisia
Expatriate footballers in Tunisia
Expatriate footballers in the United Arab Emirates
Algerian expatriate sportspeople in the United Arab Emirates
Footballers at the 2016 Summer Olympics
Olympic footballers of Algeria
Footballers from Seine-Saint-Denis